Afram Plains is in the Eastern region of Ghana and is divided into Kwahu Afram Plains North and Kwahu Afram Plains South Constituencies. The current member of Parliament for the Kwahu Afram Plains North constituency is Betty Nana Efua Krosby Mensah. She succeeded Emmanuel Aboagye Didieye. Joseph Appiah Boateng is also the current Member of Parliament for the Kwahu Afram Plains South.

Members of Parliament

See also
List of Ghana Parliament constituencies

References

Parliamentary constituencies in the Eastern Region (Ghana)